Markus Hohenwarter (born 29 January 1980) is an Austrian male mountain runner, world champion at the World Long Distance Mountain Running Championships (2012).

References

External links
 

1980 births
Living people
Austrian male long-distance runners
Austrian male mountain runners
World Long Distance Mountain Running Championships winners